In signaling games, a separating equilibrium is a type of perfect Bayesian equilibrium where agents with different characteristics choose different actions.

See also 
Signaling games
Pooling equilibrium
Cheap talk

References

Game theory game classes